Bwana Tamu was  Sultan of Pate, Kenya, from 1713. 
He decided to wage a war on Lamu in order to get the guns that the Portuguese had buried on Lamu Island, on Hedabu Hill. However, his boats were overloaded with fire-arms and they sank on the way to Lamu.

References

Sources
Martin, Chryssee MacCasler Perry and Esmond Bradley Martin:  Quest for the Past. An historical guide to the Lamu Archipelago. 1973.

 
18th-century rulers in Africa